Gautier Larsonneur (born 23 February 1997) is a French professional footballer who plays as a goalkeeper for  club Saint-Étienne.

Club career
On 11 August 2017, Larsonneur made his professional debut with Brest, keeping a clean sheet in a 0–0 Ligue 2 draw to Gazélec Ajaccio.

On 12 July 2022, Larsonneur extended his contract with Brest until 2024 and was loaned to Ligue 2 side Valenciennes for the 2022–23 season, with the option to extend the loan for the 2023–24 season as well. However, on 6 January 2023, his loan at Valenciennes was cut short; he signed for fellow Ligue 2 side Saint-Étienne on a permanent transfer for a fee of €1.6 million. Larsonneur signed a contract until 30 June 2025.

Career statistics

References

External links

1997 births
Living people
People from Saint-Renan
Sportspeople from Finistère
French footballers
France under-21 international footballers
Association football goalkeepers
Ligue 1 players
Ligue 2 players
Stade Brestois 29 players
Valenciennes FC players
AS Saint-Étienne players
Footballers from Brittany